Mirko Tarana (22 September 1913 – May 1945) was a Croatian water polo player. He competed in the men's tournament at the 1936 Summer Olympics.

References

1913 births
1945 deaths
Croatian male water polo players
Olympic water polo players of Yugoslavia
Water polo players at the 1936 Summer Olympics
Sportspeople from Dubrovnik